The 2017 Nebraska Cornhuskers football team represented the University of Nebraska during the 2017 NCAA Division I FBS football season. The team was coached by third-year head coach Mike Riley and played their home games at Memorial Stadium in Lincoln, Nebraska. They competed as members of the West Division of the Big Ten Conference. They finished the season 4–8, 3–6 in Big Ten play to finish in fifth place in the West Division.

At the conclusion of the regular season, head coach Mike Riley was fired. On December 2, the school hired UCF head coach and Nebraska alumnus Scott Frost as head coach.

Previous season

The Cornhuskers finished the 2016 season 9–4, 6–3 in Big Ten play to finish in a tie for second place in the West Division. The Cornhuskers received an invite to the Music City Bowl where they lost to Tennessee.

Offseason

Departures

Transfers

Outgoing

Incoming

Coaching departures & replacements

Other Headlines
February 22 – WR coach Keith Williams pleaded no contest to a criminal charge of driving under the influence (DUI), steming from his August 14, 2016 car accident and arrest. It is his third DUI conviction in 13 years but his first in Nebraska. He was sentenced to 30 days in jail, 3 years of probation, and ordered to pay a $1,000 fine, with his driver's license revoked and given the option to apply to have his jail sentence converted to house arrest. His jail sentence was converted to house arrest on March 1.
May 26 – Junior WR Stanley Morgan Jr. and Junior DB Antonio Reed were arrested and charged in Port Orange, Florida with misdemeanor possession of marijuana, following a traffic stop. Charges against Morgan were dropped on July 17 after he successfully completed a drug treatment program.
June 10 – Freshman early-enrollee WR Keyshawn Johnson Jr. (son of former NFL star Keyshawn Johnson) was cited for possession of marijuana in his dorm room by UNL campus police. On June 20, Johnson reportedly had left the program on a "leave of absence" and will likely not participate with the team during the season, potentially returning in January after the season.
July 8 – Nebraska defensive analysis and former safeties assistant coach Bob Elliott died in hospice care at age 64. Elliott had been hired as the team's safeties coach in mid-February 2017 but had stepped down from his position to an off-field analysis position on June 20 for "personal reasons." He had been diagnosed in 1998 with polycythemia vera (a rare blood cancer) and received a blood marrow transplant soon after. He had been suffering from health issues in recent years that had limited him to an off-field role for the 2015 and 2016 seasons at Notre Dame before coming to Nebraska.
July 16 – Incoming freshmen CB Elijah Blades and DL Deiontae Watts failed to academically qualify to attend Nebraska, and joined junior colleges as a result.

Recruiting

Position key

Recruits
As of National Signing Day (February 7, 2017), Nebraska's 2017 recruiting class consisted of 20 commits, 8 walk-ons, and 1 JUCO walk-on transfer. On, February 16, 2017, Kade Warner, son of NFL Hall of Famer Kurt Warner, joined the team as a preferred walk-on. 5 non-recruited walk-ons joined the team via tryout on March 29, 2017. One additional preferred walk-on was added in late April.

Scholarship recruits

Walk-on recruits

Tryout walk-ons

Returning starters

Offense

Defense

Special teams

Schedule

Roster and coaching staff

Depth chart

Game summaries

Spring practice

Arkansas State

Sources:

Arkansas State Game starters

at Oregon

Sources:

Oregon Game starters

Northern Illinois

Sources:

Northren Illinois Game starters

Rutgers

Sources:

Rutgers Game starters

at Illinois

Sources:

Illinois Game starters

Wisconsin

Sources:

Wisconsin Game starters

Ohio State

Sources:

Ohio State Game starters

at Purdue

Sources:

Purdue Game starters

Northwestern

Sources:

Northwestern Game starters

at Minnesota

Sources:

Minnesota Game starters

at Penn State

Sources:

Penn State Game starters

Iowa

Sources:

Iowa Game starters

Big Ten Awards

Player of the Week Honors

All-Conference Awards

2017 Big Ten All-Conference Teams and Awards

National Awards

USA Today Freshman All-American
JD Spielman

FWAA Freshman All-American
JD Spielman

Team awards
2016 Nebraska Football Team Awards

Players in the 2018 NFL Draft

Rankings

References

Nebraska
Nebraska Cornhuskers football seasons
Nebraska Cornhuskers football